Celtic Tales may refer to:

Celtic Tales, a graphic novel in the Corto Maltese series, by Hugo Pratt
Celtic Tales: Balor of the Evil Eye, a videogame
Celtic mythology